Birdsong, along with bird calls, are sounds made by birds.

Birdsong or Bird Song may also refer to:

Arts and entertainment

Film, television and literature
 Birdsong (novel), by Sebastian Faulks, 1993
 Birdsong (radio drama), 1997, based on the novel
 Birdsong (play), 2010, based on the novel
 Birdsong (serial), a 2012 TV adaptation of the novel
 Birdsong (2008 film), a Catalan film
 Birdsong (radio channel), a temporary channel on British digital radio

Music
 The Birdsongs (band), an American Christian rock band

Albums
 Bird Song (Mannheim Steamroller album), 2001
 Bird Song (Hampton Hawes album), recorded 1956–58, released 1999
 Bird Songs (Joe Lovano album), 2011
 Bird Songs (Sphere album), 1988
 Bird Songs: The Final Recordings, by Dizzy Gillespie, 1997
 Bird Song: Live 1971, by The Holy Modal Rounders, 2004

Songs
 "Birdsong", a composition by Graham Ashton
 "Bird Songs", a 1907 song by Liza Lehmann
 "Bird Song" (Lene Lovich song), 1979
 "Bird Song" (M.I.A. song), 2016
 "Bird Song", a song by Jerry Garcia, from the 1972 album Garcia
 "Bird Song", a song by Florence and the Machine from the 2009 album Lungs: The B-Sides

People
 Birdsong (surname), including a list of people with the surname

Places
 Birdsong, Alabama, U.S.
 Birdsong, Arkansas, U.S.
 Birdsong Sandstone, a geologic formation in Australia

See also 

 Song of the Birds (disambiguation)